American Ghetto is the fifth studio album by American rock band Portugal. The Man, released in March 2010 to coincide with the band's North American tour.
The CD version is limited to 15,000 copies.

American Ghetto was created in just 10 days.
The album cover features a picture of lead singer John Gourley's dad's barn, coinciding with the hometown theme of the album. In an interview with Rolling Stone magazine, the band said that "It's about places we used to go growing up – it's kind of a fun record in that way."

Track listing

Personnel
 John Baldwin Gourley – vocals, guitar
 Jason Sechrist – drums
 Ryan Neighbors – keyboard, vocals
 Zachary Scott Carothers – bass, vocals
 Zoe Manville – vocals
 Ian Shaw – backing vocals
 Bella Nobu – roadie, kazoo

Release history

References

External links
Portugal. The Man's site on the album

2010 albums
Portugal. The Man albums
Equal Vision Records albums